Santa Maria della Croce is a Roman Catholic parish church located in Regalbuto, province of Enna, Sicily, Italy.

History
A church at the site was first begun in the 15th century, and placed under the leadership of the Chiesa Matrice of San Basilio. Construction was slow and only complete in 1744. The interior decoration was not complete until 1805. The church has a large central nave separated from the aisles by a rows of columns. The church ends in three naves. The presebytery is elevated from the nave. The interior has a richly colored stucco decoration. 

The church and some of the artworks were heavily damaged by bombardments in 1943. Some of the altars have been replaced by those from the former church of Sant'Antonio da Padova (found in the town's Convent of Santa Maria degli Angeli) and from the church of  Sant Agostino. The baroque facade is rich in columns.

References

Churches in the province of Enna
18th-century Roman Catholic church buildings in Italy
Regalbuto